The following is the complete list of the 659 Virtual Console titles that were available for the Wii in Japan sorted by system and release dates. English translations are highlighted between parenthesis. The final update was on April 9, 2013 as the service has been discontinued in all regions while games are currently being added to the Nintendo 3DS Virtual Console and Wii U Virtual Console services.

Nintendo has long since discontinued the Wii Shop Channel. Purchasing of Wii Points for new games ended on March 26, 2018. In addition, the ability to purchase new software ended on January 31, 2019. Re-downloading purchased software remained available, however Nintendo had already shut that facility down at a later date.

Titles

Family Computer / Disk System
126 Family Computer games and 23 Family Computer Disk System games were available, with the Family Computer released in 1983, and the add-on Famicom Disk System released in 1986, both by Nintendo.

Super Famicom
102 Super Famicom games were available, which was released in 1990 by Nintendo.

Nintendo 64
20 Nintendo 64 games were available, which was released in 1996 by Nintendo.

PC Engine
91 PC Engine games, 7 CD-ROM² games, and 27 Super CD-ROM² games were available, with the PC Engine released in 1987, the original CD-ROM² standard launched in 1988, and the Super CD-ROM² standard launched in 1991, all of them by NEC and Hudson Soft/Konami.

SEGA Mark III / SEGA Master System
14 SEGA Mark III / SEGA Master System games were available, which was released in 1985 by SEGA.

SEGA Mega Drive
91 SEGA Mega Drive games were available, which was released in 1988 by SEGA.

Neo Geo
75 Neo Geo games were available, which was released in 1990 by SNK.

MSX
8 MSX games and 7 MSX2 games were available, with the MSX standard launched in 1983, and the MSX2 standard launched in 1986, both by Microsoft Japan and ASCII.

Virtual Console Arcade
78 arcade games were available, most of them by Bandai Namco Entertainment, others from other video game developers like SEGA, Taito, and Capcom.

Update notes 
There was no update in the week of New Year: January 2, 2007; January 1, 2008; December 30, 2008; December 29, 2009 etc.
Additional updates have occurred on Fridays during 2007: April 6; August 10 and September 28.
There was no update in the second week of August every year due to the Obon Festival: August 14, 2007; August 12, 2008 etc.
Additional updates have occurred on Thursdays: September 20, 2007 (due to the Friday being a holiday) and March 26, 2009.
Starting from 2009, there is no update during each Golden Week: May 5, 2009; May 4, 2010 and May 3, 2011.
There was no update on Citizen's Holiday: September 22, 2009.
Starting from 2010, there are sometimes WiiWare-only or no Wii Shop updates: May 18; August 17; August 24; September 28 etc.

See also
List of Virtual Console games for Nintendo 3DS (Japan)
List of Virtual Console games for Wii U (Japan)
List of WiiWare games

References 

Virtual Console games for Wii
Virtual Console games for Wii